Port Chester Harbor is the name of a bay located in the village of Port Chester on Long Island Sound, in Westchester County, New York. The harbor is the entrance to Byram River, which leads to the town of Port Chester, and lies 1 mile west-northwestward of Great Captain Island. It is protected by a breakwater, which is marked at its south end by Port Chester light.

References

External links
 USGS - Geographic Names Information System - Port Chester Harbor
 NY Hometown Locator - Port Chester Harbor map

Bays of New York (state)
Port Chester, New York
Long Island Sound
Bays of Westchester County, New York